Twelve referendums were held in Switzerland in 1985. The first four were held on 10 March on abolishing primary school fees (approved), abolishing the government contribution to healthcare spending (approved), a federal resolution on education fees (rejected) and a popular initiative on extending paid leave (rejected). The next set of four was held on 9 June on the "right to life" popular initiative (rejected), abolishing the cantonal share of profits from banks' stamp duty (approved), a federal resolution on the taxation raised from the sale of spirits (approved), and the abolition of grants for the self-supply of breadstuffs (approved).

A further three referendums were held on 22 September on a popular initiative to co-ordinate the start of the school year (approved), a federal resolution on giving small and medium enterprises an advantage in cases on innovations (rejected), and amendments to the Swiss Civil Code (approved). The final referendum was held on 1 December on a popular initiative to ban vivisection, which was rejected.

Results

March: Abolition of primary school fees

March: Healthcare

March: Education fees

March: Extending paid leave

June: Right to life

June: Stamp duty for banks

June: Tax on spirits

June: Breadstuffs

September: Co-ordinating the start of the School year

September: Innovations

September: Changes to the Civil Code

December: Banning vivisection

References

1985 referendums
1985 in Switzerland
Referendums in Switzerland
Abortion referendums